Meftah is a district in Blida Province, Algeria. It was named after its capital, Meftah.

Municipalities
The district is further divided into 2 municipalities:
Meftah
Djebabra

Notable people 
 Yahia Boushaki (Shahid) (1935-1960), Algerian leader and martyr.

Districts of Blida Province